Gurnam Singh Abulkhurana (16 April 1931 – 23 March 2021) was an Indian politician and was a member of the  Legislative Assembly representing Lambi in Punjab.

He was a Minister of Irrigation and Revenue in Government of Punjab from 1992–1997.
He has three sons and a daughter. His son Jagpal Singh Abulkhurana is a congress party general secretary. 

Abulkhurana died on 23 March 2021 in Chandigarh, India.

References

External links
 https://www.elections.in/punjab/assembly-constituencies/1992-election-results.html
 https://www.latestly.com/elections/assembly-elections/punjab/1992/lambi/gurnam-singh-abul-khurana/

Punjabi politicians
1931 births
2021 deaths
Punjab, India MLAs 1992–1997
State cabinet ministers of Punjab, India
Indian National Congress politicians
Indian National Congress politicians from Punjab, India